The 2016 North Carolina Tar Heels men's soccer team will represent the University of North Carolina at Chapel Hill during the 2015 NCAA Division I men's soccer season. It will be the 70th season of the university fielding a program.

Schedule 

|-
!colspan=6 style="background:#56A0D3; color:#FFFFFF;"| Preseason
|-

|-
!colspan=6 style="background:#56A0D3; color:#FFFFFF;"| Regular Season
|-

|-
!colspan=6 style="background:#56A0D3; color:#FFFFFF;"| ACC Tournament
|-

|-
!colspan=6 style="background:#56A0D3; color:#FFFFFF;"| NCAA Tournament
|-

|-

See also 

 North Carolina Tar Heels men's soccer
 2016 Atlantic Coast Conference men's soccer season
 2016 NCAA Division I men's soccer season
 2016 ACC Men's Soccer Tournament
 2016 NCAA Division I Men's Soccer Championship

References

External links 
2016 UNC Tar Heels Men's Soccer Schedule

North Carolina Tar Heels
North Carolina Tar Heels men's soccer seasons
North Carolina Tar Heels, Soccer
North Carolina Tar Heels
NCAA Division I Men's Soccer Tournament College Cup seasons